The Public Service Commission (PSC; Māori: Te Kawa Mataaho), called the State Services Commission until 2020, is the central public service department of New Zealand charged with overseeing, managing, and improving the performance of the state sector of New Zealand and its organisations.

The PSC's official responsibilities, as defined by the State Sector Act 1988, include:
 appointing and reviewing Public Service chief executives,
 promoting and developing senior leadership and management capability for the Public Service,
 providing advice on the training and career development of staff in the Public Service,
 reviewing the performance of each department,
 providing advice on the allocation of functions to and between departments and other agencies,
 providing advice on management systems, structures, and organisations in the Public Service and Crown entities,
 promoting, developing, and monitoring equal employment opportunities policies and programmes, and
 any other functions with respect to the administration and management of the Public Service, as directed by the Prime Minister.

The role of PSC, as described in the four year plan, is "to work with leaders across the State Services to change the way agencies think, organise and operate".

Commissioner
The Public Service Commissioner is the chief executive of the commission and has a range of responsibilities for the public service, the State Services and the wider state sector. The position has previously been known as the Public Service Commissioner, Chairman of the Public Service Commissioner, Chairman of the State Services Commission, and Chief Commissioner of the Public Service Commission. The current Public Service Commissioner is Peter Hughes.

Modern role
The State Services Commissioner plays a central role in New Zealand's public service. One of the Commissioner's most visible roles is in the employment, supervision and dismissal of senior executives in individual Government departments; by preventing Ministers of the Crown from becoming personally involved in employment decisions, this acts as a safeguard against politicisation of the public service. The Commissioner also has power to issue codes of conduct for parts of the public service, to investigate Government departments, and to advise the Government on the organisation of the public service.

The Commissioner has a statutory duty to act independently of Ministerial direction, except in matters concerning the appointment and dismissal of Departmental chief executives.

Regarding the appointment of Departmental chief executives, the Commissioner plays a key role. The Commissioner is responsible for:

 Notifying the responsible Minister or Ministers of the vacancy;
 Advertising the position;
 Assembling an interviewing panel which includes, at minimum, the Commissioner and his or her Deputy; the Commissioner may invite others in consultation with the Minister;
 Recommending the preferred candidate to the Minister, who will then refer the recommendation to the Governor-General in Council.

The Governor-General in Council may override the Commissioner's recommendation by appointing a different person to the vacant executive post.

A chief executive may not be appointed for any longer than five years. Under the State Services Act, the Commissioner negotiates terms and conditions of employment with each Departmental chief executive, subject to the approval of the Prime Minister and the Minister of State Services. The Commissioner may also recommend that a given chief executive be reappointed when the executive's contract expires, though the Government is free to ignore such a recommendation.

The Commissioner is empowered, with the agreement of the Government, to dismiss a Departmental chief executive, "for just cause or excuse". That is, the Government is by law forbidden from firing any chief executive or instructing a Commissioner to do so, but has the power to retain a chief executive against the Commissioner's advice.

Appointment, dismissal and term of office

The position of State Services Commissioner is one of the few positions in New Zealand's public service where Ministers are directly involved.

The appointment and dismissal procedures and the term of office are set forth in the State Sector Act 1988, as amended from time to time. Section 3 of the Act specifies that the Commissioner is to be appointed by the Governor-General in Council on the recommendation of the Prime Minister. Section 13 limits the term of office to five years, though this term may be further reduced in the Order in Council in which the appointment is made.

Section 17 of the Act lists a small number of circumstances in which the Commissioner is deemed to have resigned. Otherwise, the Commissioner is well protected. The Governor-General has no power to dismiss the Commissioner. The Governor-General may suspend the Commissioner under Section 16 for misbehaviour or incompetence, but must then explain why to the House of Representatives within seven sitting days; and even then the Commissioner is safe in his position unless the House resolves within three weeks after receiving the Governor-General's explanation to remove him or her from office. Otherwise, the Commissioner is restored to office.

History of the role
At the end of the first decade of the twentieth century, New Zealand's public sector was widely considered to be inefficient and wasteful. The incoming MacKenzie administration launched the Hunt Commission on the civil service. The Hunt Commission recommended the establishment of a Board of Management under Cabinet to have 'absolute and undisputed power' in 'all matters relating to the control and management of the Service – ... appointments, salaries, promotion, suspensions, dismissals, and indeed everything affecting officers – '.

Public Service Act 1912
The Hunt Commission and its recommendations lead to the Public Service Act 1912 and the role of the Public Service Commissioner. The Act and the new Commissioner removed Ministers' direct involvement in appointments and personnel administration, separating the 'political' and 'administrative' functions, both in conduct of the Government's business and in management of the Public Service itself.

State Services Act 1962
The State Services Act 1962 replaced the Public Service Commissioner with a multi-member Commission comprising a chairman and Commissioner. This point also marked a culture change towards a focus on political neutrality.

State Sector Act 1988
The State Sector Act 1988 reverted to having a single State Services Commissioner, adding the position of Deputy State Services Commissioner. Ministers were granted some role in the appointments of departmental chief executives. There was some concern at the time that this would revert the system to a pre-1912 state.

Following the Review of the Centre in 2001, the State Sector Amendment Act (No 2) 2004 and the Crown Entities Act 2004 extended the role of the Commissioner beyond the Public Service to the wider State Services (such as Crown entities, but not Crown Research Institutes), and beyond State Services to the wider state sector.

List of commissioners

Deputy Commissioner
The State Sector Act establishes the position of Deputy State Services Commissioner, who is appointed on the same terms and conditions as the Commissioner.

Ministers for the Public Service
Key

References

External links

New Zealand Government Jobs Online
History of the Office of State Services Commissioner, State Services Commission
https://www.beehive.govt.nz/release/peter-hughes-new-state-services-commissioner

 
1913 establishments in New Zealand
Government agencies established in the 1910s
Government agencies of New Zealand
National civil service commissions